Parliamentary elections were held in Laos on 30 April 2011. The ruling Lao People's Revolutionary Party (LPRP) won 128 of the 132 seats in the National Assembly.

Campaign
A total of 190 candidates contested the 132 seats, of which 185 were members of the LPRP.

Results

References

Elections in Laos
Laos
2011 in Laos
One-party elections
April 2011 events in Asia
Election and referendum articles with incomplete results